Edku (also Edkhou, or Idku) is a town in the Beheira Governorate, located east of Alexandria and west of Rashid, overlooking the Mediterranean Sea. Edku lies on a sandy strip behind Abi Qir Bay, in the northwestern Nile River delta. Drained by Al-Madiyyah Channel, connecting with the Mediterranean, the lagoon is reputed to be the ancient Canopic branch of the Nile. Edku's isthmus position enables it to capitalize on the fisheries of both the lagoon and the Mediterranean. Other industries include rice milling and silk weaving.

Just northeast of the town lies a large natural gas liquefaction (LNG) plant jointly-owned by Shell and Petronas. The plant complex opened in 2005 and consists of two LNG trains capable of liquifying up to a total of 7.2 million tons of natural gas per year. It is one of two LNG export plants in Egypt (the other being the SEGAS LNG plant in Damietta).

History 
Edmu was one of the ancient cities of the Pharaonic era. It was within the province of "Ra Amenati", where many ancient pharaonic cities have become uninhabited to be replaced by other cities, including the city of "Tajo", which is Edku currently, and some historians believe that the name of Edco Pharaonic is " Jackat " which means in Ancient Egyptian language the high hill, and it is clear that the urbanization is related to the sandy hills north of Lake Idku and also tells one of the historians that its ancient name is mentioned in the bishop's revelation in the name of Etco.

Idku was conquered in the succession of Omar bin Al-Khattab by order of him to the leader Amr bin Al-Aas at the hands of "Abdullah bin Omar" and the governor of Idko was "Zarand". The king and his army took refuge in the forts and closed the walls, and the Arabs surrounded and the siege lasted for six months.

The 1885 Census of Egypt recorded Edku as a nahiyah in the district of Atf in Gharbia Governorate; at that time, the population of the town was 5,751 (2,937 men and 2,814 women).

References

External links 
 Map of Edku

Populated places in Beheira Governorate